Oliver James Martin is a British figure skater and also competes in  artistic roller skating. He has won British Championship titles including Senior Men's Solo-Dance for Artistic Roller Skating, and Junior Men's Solo-Dance for Figure Skating. Oliver was ranked 9th in the 2018 World Artistic Roller Skating Championships held in La Vendée, France.

International ranking

National ranking

References 

British male ice dancers
Artistic roller skaters
Year of birth missing (living people)
Living people